António Silva Travassos (born 24 September 1971) is a Portuguese middle-distance runner. He competed in the men's 1500 metres at the 1996 Summer Olympics.

References

1971 births
Living people
Athletes (track and field) at the 1996 Summer Olympics
Portuguese male middle-distance runners
Olympic athletes of Portugal
Place of birth missing (living people)
Universiade bronze medalists for Portugal
Universiade medalists in athletics (track and field)
Medalists at the 1997 Summer Universiade